The Women in Arts Award is an award established in 2019 by UN Women Ukraine and the Ukrainian Institute, and presented as part of HeForShe Ukraine's annual arts week in March. Only women are nominated for the award; its purpose is to bring attention to the achievements of female artists in Ukraine, who have been historically overlooked by the Ukrainian arts scene.

Structure
Six women receive the Women in Arts Award every year, in six categories:
Visual Arts: Creators of visual media, like sculptors, painters, or those working with new media.
Music: Writers and composers of musical works.
Theater and Film: Creators in theater and film, like directors, screenwriters, and actors.
Literature: Professionals in literature, like writers or poets.
Cultural Management: Those that help distribute art, like curators and festival organizers.
Cultural Journalism, Criticism, and Research (introduced in 2020): Those that track and review art, like critics, art historians, researchers, or publicists.

Laureates

2019
Visual Arts: Vlada Ralko
Music: Nina Garenetska
Theater and Film: Irma Vitovska-Vantsa
Literature: Kateryna Kalytko
Cultural Management: Olesya Ostrovska-Lyuta

2020
Visual Arts: Lada Nakonechna
Music: alyona alyona
Theater and Film: Nataliia Vorozhbyt
Literature: Oksana Zabuzhko
Cultural Management: Yulia Sinkevych
Cultural Journalism, Criticism, and Research: Dariya Badyor

2021
Visual Arts: Alina Kleytman
Music: Oksana Lyniv
Theater: Tamara Trunova
Film: Iryna Tsilyk
Literature: Sofia Andrukhovych
Cultural Management: Yulia Fediv
Cultural Journalism, Criticism, and Research: Vira Baldynyuk

Statuette
Winners of the Women in Arts Award receive a statuette designed by Ukrainian sculptor Maria Kulikovska. The unique figurine is designed to look like two hands  whose palms are conjoined, symbolizing support among women.

See also
HeForShe
Arts of Ukraine
Shevchenko National Prize

References

2019 establishments in Ukraine
Awards established in 2019
Ukrainian art awards
Awards honoring women